The Museum of Chinese in America (abbreviated MOCA) is a museum in New York City which exhibits Chinese American history. It is a nonprofit 501(c)(3) education and cultural institution that presents the living history, heritage, culture, and diverse experiences of Chinese Americans through exhibitions, educational services and public programs. Much of its collection was damaged or destroyed in a fire in January 2020. After being closed for more than a year following the fire, the museum reopened to the public on July 15, 2021.



History 
Founded in 1980 in Manhattan's Chinatown, the museum began as the New York Chinatown History Project by historian John Kuo Wei Tchen and community resident and activist Charles Lai to promote understanding of the Chinese American experience and to address the concern that "the memories and experiences of aging older generations would perish without oral history, photo documentation, research and collecting efforts." From 1997 to 2006, Fay Chew Matsuda served as director of the museum.

In 2005, the museum received part of a $20 million grant from the Carnegie Corporation, made possible through a donation by then-New York City mayor Michael Bloomberg.

The museum moved to a new site at 215 Centre Street in 2009. The space was designed by architect Maya Lin and was six times as large as the old site. The permanent exhibition, With a Single Step, was designed by Matter Practice. In May 2011, Herb Tam became curator and director of exhibitions. 

In 2019, the museum relaunched their gift store with a new partner, the Asian American retail brand Pearl River Mart. Called MOCA Shop by Pearl River, the store is a "curated collection of items that hold great meaning in Chinese American culture."

In January 2020, a fire damaged the building at 70 Mulberry Street, where the museum's collection was held, with about 85,000 items potentially affected by water damage. While it was initially believed that nearly all of them might have been lost, a substantial part was determined to be "very much salvageable" several days after the incident. Around 35,000 items had been digitized and backed up before the fire. Much of the collection was restored by disaster-relief specialists who worked to prevent mold growth and preserve structure.

Exhibitions 

The core exhibition With a Single Step: Stories in the Making of America discusses over 160 years of Chinese American history and is augmented annually with two to four rotating exhibitions on thematic, historic, and artistic subjects.

The museum in January 2015 presented Waves of Identity: 35 Years of Archiving. The title of the exhibit was inspired by a Chinese proverb, “Each wave of the Yangtze River pushes at the wave ahead.”

Current 
 With a Single Step: Stories in the Making of America (September 1, 2009 – December 31, 2023)

Former 

 Responses: Asian American Voices Resisting the Tides of Racism (July 15, 2021 – September 18, 2022)
 an unlikely photojournalist: Emile Bocian in Chinatown (December 14, 2020 – December 31, 2021)
 Gathering: Collecting and Documenting Chinese American History (October 17, 2019 – March 22, 2020)
 The Chinese Helped Build the Railroad - The Railroad Helped Build America (October 17, 2019 – March 22, 2020)
 FOLD: Golden Venture Paper Sculptures (October 5, 2017 - March 25, 2018)
 Sour, Sweet, Bitter, Spicy: Stories of Chinese Food and Identity in America (October 6, 2016 – September 10, 2017)
 Stage Design by Ming Cho Lee (April 28, 2016 – September 11, 2016)
 Chinese Style: Rediscovering the Architecture of Poy Gum Lee, 1923–1968 (September 24, 2015 – March 27, 2016)
 SUB URBANISMS: Casino Urbanization, Chinatowns, and the Contested American Landscape (September 24, 2015 – March 27, 2016)
 Yu Lik Wai: It's a Bright Guilty World (October 8, 2015 – August 11, 2016)
 Water to Paper, Paint to Sky: The Art of Tyrus Wong (March 26, 2015 – September 13, 2015)
 Memory Prints: The Story World of Phillip Chen (September 25, 2014 – January 3, 2015)
 Waves of Identity: 35 Years of Archiving (September 25, 2014 – January 3, 2015)
 Oil and Water: Reinterpreting Ink (April 24, 2014 – September 14, 2014)
 The Lee Family of New York Chinatown Since 1888 (October 23, 2013 – June 6, 2014)
 A Floating Population (December 13, 2013 – April 13, 2014)
 Portraits of New York Chinatown (December 13, 2013 – April 13, 2014)
 Front Row: Chinese American Designers (April 26, 2013 – December 1, 2013)
 Shanghai Glamour: New Women 1910s–40s (April 26, 2013 – November 3, 2013)
 Marvels and Monsters: Unmasking Asian Images in U.S. Comics, 1942–1986 and Alt. Comics: Asian American Artists Reinvent the Comic (September 27, 2012 – February 24, 2013)
 America through a Chinese Lens (April 26, 2012 – September 9, 2012)
 Lee Mingwei: The Travelers and The Quartet Project (October 20, 2011 – March 26, 2012)
 Unearthing (May 5, 2011 – September 19, 2011)
 Chinese Puzzles (November 6, 2010 – April 9, 2011)
 Chinatown POV: Reflections on September 11 (September 11, 2010 – November 29, 2010)
 Both Here and There: Yale-China and a Century of Transformative Encounters (September 2, 2010 – October 11, 2010)
 Here & Now: Chapter III Towards Transculturalism (February 11, 2010 – March 28, 2010)
 Here & Now: Chapter II Crossing Boundaries (November 19, 2009 – January 4, 2010)
 Here & Now: Chinese Artists in New York Chapter 1 (September 22, 2009 – November 2, 2009)

Collections 
As of early 2020, MOCA's Collections and Research Center contained more than 85,000 artifacts, photos, memorabilia, documents, oral histories, and art work.  The collection covers a timespan of 160 years and includes e.g. historical Chinese restaurant menus, boat tickets, family photographs, and wedding dresses.

Research Center 
The museum's previous gallery space on 70 Mulberry Street is used as an archival center and serves as a research center.  The Research Center contains applications, such as Web-based versions of gallery exhibitions and an interactive timeline of Chinese American history. The center also provides resources on topics such as immigration and diversity. The Research Center was damaged by fire in 2020.

Special collections 
Special collections include:

Legacy Awards Gala 
At MOCA's 2015 Legacy Awards Gala, the museum honored several people and organizations for their roles in Chinese-American culture. Honorees were the C.V. Starr Scholars, Hong Kong-born American actor Nancy Kwan, and Kohn Pedersen Fox Associates founding design partner William C. Louie.

2014 honorees included:
 Tyrus Wong
 Theodore T. Wang
 Victor and William Fung Foundation Ltd.

2013 honorees included:
 Michael Bloomberg
 Pei-Yuan Chia
 Ming Tsai
 Wang Yannan

2012 honorees included:
 Angelica Cheung
 Silas Chou
 Calvin Tsao
 Humberto Leon and Carol Lim

2011 honorees included:
 Oscar L. Tang
 David Liu
 Dominic Ng
 Pichet Ong

2010 honorees included:
 The Chao Family
 Maurice R. Greenberg & The Starr Foundation
 HSBC Bank USA
 Anita Lo
 Bill and Judith Davidson Moyers
 Ben Wang
 Major General John L. Fugh *(posthumous award)

2009 honorees included:
 Ronnie C. Chan
 Charles B. Wang Community Health Center
 Anla Cheng
 Mark E. Kingdon
 Lucy Liu
 Wan-go Weng
 Jerry Yang

See also 

Chinese Americans in New York City
Chinese American Museum (based in Los Angeles)
Chinese Historical Society of America (based in San Francisco)
Chinese Historical Society of Southern California
Chinese Culture Center (based in San Francisco)
Chinese American Museum Washington, DC
Weaverville Joss House State Historic Park
List of museums and cultural institutions in New York City

References

External links 

Museums in Manhattan
Museums established in 1980
Chinese-American museums
Chinese-American culture in New York City
Chinatown, Manhattan
Ethnic museums in New York City
History museums in New York City
1980 establishments in New York City